The G1 Aviation G1 is a French STOL ultralight aircraft, designed and produced by G1 Aviation of Tallard. The aircraft is supplied as a kit for amateur construction or as a complete ready-to-fly-aircraft.

Zenith Aircraft considers the G1 an unauthorized copy of the Zenith STOL CH 701.

Design and development
The aircraft is derived from the Alisport Yuma and was designed to comply with the Fédération Aéronautique Internationale microlight rules. It features a strut-braced high wing, a two-seats-in-side-by-side configuration enclosed cockpit, fixed tricycle landing gear and a single engine in tractor configuration.

All G1 models have a fuselage made from welded steel tubing, with the wing made from aluminum, all covered in doped aircraft fabric. All models are equipped with flaps and have optional folding wings for ground transport and storage. Standard engines available are the  Rotax 912UL and the  Rotax 912ULS four-stroke powerplants. The company also offers a new exhaust system for the Rotax 912 that is quieter than the stock Rotax-supplied system.

The aircraft has also been equipped with the JLT Motors Ecoyota engine.

Variants
G1 Amphibie (English - Amphibian)
Amphibious version on aluminium floats.
G1 Gelinotte (English - Hazel Grouse)
Wheel-equipped version. The wing is equipped with leading edge slots.
G1 la Grive (English - Thrush)
Agricultural aircraft version.
G1 SPYL
Wheel-equipped version introduced at the Aero show held in Friedrichshafen in 2010 and named for the two designers of the aircraft model, Serge Present and Yvan Lhermitte. The SPYL replaces the Gelinotte's wing, which is equipped with leading edge slots, with a new wing equipped with vortex generators instead. The new wing makes this model  lighter and 15%-20% faster than the Gelinotte. SPYL wings can be retrofitted to the Gelinotte.
G1 Agricole
Agricultural aircraft version with the same wing as the SPYL, employing vortex generators in place of leading edge slots. It is only sold ready-to-fly with the  Rotax 912ULS engine.

Specifications (G1 SPYL)

References

External links

2000s French ultralight aircraft
Homebuilt aircraft
Single-engined tractor aircraft